Bryan County Courthouse may refer to:

Bryan County Courthouse (Georgia), Pembroke, Georgia
Bryan County Courthouse (Oklahoma), Durant, Oklahoma